Militaris may refer to:
 Via Militaris, an ancient Roman road
 Vir militaris, a Roman legate that governed a consular military province of the Roman Empire

See also
 Militari